The U.S. Track & Field and Cross Country Coaches Association (USTFCCCA) is a New Orleans, Louisiana-based professional association representing men's and women's cross country and track & field coaches in the United States. The organization has about 8,000 members. 94% of NCAA track & field programs are members of USTFCCCA.

The group serves as an advocate for coaches, providing a national forum to address their needs. It also serves as a lobbyist for coaches' interests, and a "liaison between the various stakeholders" in the sport.

Hall of Fame
The organization is the custodian of the USTFCCCA Coaches Hall of Fame, founded in 1995.

The Bowerman
The organization administers the highest award given in collegiate track & field, The Bowerman.  The award was founded in 2009.

References

External links
Member Schools

Track and field organizations
Cross country running organizations
Trac
College track and field coaches in the United States
Lobbying organizations in the United States
Non-profit organizations based in Louisiana
Organizations based in New Orleans